Maksym Mykhaylovych Bahachanskyi (born 5 June 2002) is a Ukrainian professional footballer who plays as an attacking midfielder for Ukrainian Premier League club Metalist Kharkiv.

References

External links
 
 

2002 births
Living people
People from Krasnohrad
Kharkiv State College of Physical Culture 1 alumni
Ukrainian footballers
Association football midfielders
FC Metalist Kharkiv players
FC Vovchansk players
Ukrainian Premier League players
Ukrainian Second League players
21st-century Ukrainian people